Neudamm is a farm and settlement in the Khomas Region of central Namibia, situated on the B6 between Windhoek and Gobabis close to Windhoek's international airport. The entire area is a campus of the University of Namibia for agricultural education and experimental farming. Neudamm Railway Station connects the settlement to the railway network.

Agricultural education at Neudamm was established in 1928, and the railway line was commissioned in 1930.

References

Populated places in the Khomas Region